An Ríl Deal is a traditional Irish dancing television show on the Irish television channel TG4 that has been described as "Ireland's answer to Strictly Come Dancing". It is judged by Breandán De Gallaí, Sibéal Davitt and Roy Galvin and is run as a competition, with the winner getting to donate €5,000 towards a charity of their choice. In 2017, the winner was sent to New York City, USA to perform one night on Broadway.

References

TG4 original programming
Dance television shows
2016 Irish television series debuts